Mohan Phad also known as Mohan Phad or Phad is a BJP politician from Parbhani District, Maharashtra. He was a member of the 13th Maharashtra Legislative Assembly representing the Pathri Assembly Constituency.

Political career
Phad has been elected in Maharashtra Legislative Assembly election in 2014 from Pathri constituency as Independent candidate and later joined BJP. In Maharashtra assembly election 2019, He contested as a Bharatiya Janata Party candidate and lost to the INC candidate from Pathri constituency.

References 

Living people
Bharatiya Janata Party politicians from Maharashtra
Maharashtra MLAs 2014–2019
Republican Party of India (Athawale) politicians
Year of birth missing (living people)
People from Parbhani district